Frank Jakobsen (born 28 April 1954) is a Norwegian jazz musician (drums), known from a number of recordings, and central to the jazz scenes in Bergen and Oslo.

Career 
Jakobsen was born and raised in Bergen, where he played in local groups like Danmarks Plass Rock & Jazz (1974–80), Frk. Pirk (1976–78), Bergen Big Band, Trang Fødsel and Son Mu among others. He played with jazz musicians like Dag Arnesen, Knut Kristiansen, Vigleik Storaas, Olav Dale, Jan Kåre Hystad. During a period where he lived in Oslo he cooperated with Cutting Edge, Thorgeir Stubø, Knut Riisnæs, Paul Weeden, Guttorm Guttormsen, Søyr, Rune Klakegg, Rob Waring and Carl Morten Iversen.

Honors 
Vossajazzprisen (1997)

Discography (in selection) 

 Within Dag Arnesen's "Ny Bris»
1982: Ny Bris (Odin Records)

 Within Cutting Edge
1982: Cutting Edge (Odin Records)
1984: Our Man in Paradise (Odin Records)
1995: Alle tre (Curling Legs)

With Carl Morten Iversen and Rob Waring
1992: Secret Red Thread (Odin Records)

 Within Rune Klakegg Trio
1992: Anaerobics (Odin Records)

With Knut Kristiansen
1995: Monk Moods (Odin Records)

With Olav Dale Quartet
1997: Little Waltz (NorCD), including Sebastian Dubé & Dag Arnesen

 Within Bergen Big Band
2003: Adventures in European New Jazz And Improvised Music (Europe Jazz Oddysey), with Mathias Rüegg "Art & Fun" on compilation with various artists
2005: Seagull (Grappa Music), feat. Karin Krog conducted by John Surman recorded at the Nattjazz Festival, Bergen 2004
2007: Meditations on Coltrane (Grappa Music), with The Core
2008: Som den gyldne sol frembryter (Grappa Music)
2010: Crime Scene (ECM Records), with Terje Rypdal recorded at the Nattjazz Festival, Bergen 2009

With other projects
1992: Nattjazz 20 år (Grappa Music)
1995: Den lilla kvelven (Nimis), with Kenneth Sivertsen, poems written and read by Jon Fosse
1996: Jazz Out of Norway (Odin Records), sampler
1997: Med kjøtt og kjærlighet ((Curling Legs)), within Søyr, poetry by Niels Fredrik Dahl and Torgeir Rebolledo Pedersen
1997: Hybel (Norsk Plateproduksjon), within Trang Fødsel
1998: Close to My Heart (Ponca Jazz Records), with Finn Hauge (including Olga Konkova & Terje Gewelt)
1999: Cocoon (Acoustic Records), with "Cocoon" (including Barbro Husdal, Carsten Dyngeland & Sigurd Ulveset)
2000: City Dust (Curling Legs), with Helén Eriksen
2001: Touching (Resonant Music), with Knut Riisnæs
2001: Synchronize Your Watches (Resonant Music), within Rob Waring Trio
2002: Julestemning (Lynor), with "Bergen Nord Kammerkor" conducted by Bjørn Berentsen
2003: Hush Hush (EMI Music, Norway), with Nathalie Nordnes
2004: Reworks; :.What Kind of Machine Is This?, with Chillienuts
2005: De aller beste (Sony BMG Music), with Trang Fødsel
2005: Seagull (Grappa Music), within Bergen Big Band feat. Karin Krog & John Surman
2005: Join Me in the Park (EMI Music, Norway), with Nathalie Nordnes
2006: Vargtime 2 – Four Cousins (Gemini Records), within Jan Kåre Hystad Kvartett
2006: Barna synger Pophits (Barneselskapet)
2011: Live in Bergen (Acoustic Records), with Ole Amund Gjersvik

References

External links 
Frank Jakobsen Biography on Norsk Musikkinformasjon

20th-century Norwegian drummers
21st-century Norwegian drummers
Norwegian jazz drummers
Male drummers
Norwegian jazz composers
Male jazz composers
1954 births
Living people
Musicians from Bergen
20th-century drummers
20th-century Norwegian male musicians
21st-century Norwegian male musicians
Bergen Big Band members
Cutting Edge (band) members
Søyr members